The 1992 Daytona 500, the 34th running of the event, was held February 16 at Daytona International Speedway in Daytona Beach, Florida as the first race of the 1992 NASCAR Winston Cup season. Davey Allison of Robert Yates Racing won the race after leading 127 laps, including the final 30. Sterling Marlin won the pole, driving the No. 22 Ford for Junior Johnson & Associates. Richard Petty gave the command to start the engines from the cockpit of the famous #43 Pontiac for his team in his final appearance in the race as a driver. This would also be the final Daytona 500 start for 1972 winner A. J. Foyt, who would also start his final Indianapolis 500 later that year. Rick Wilson made his final start for the Stavola Brothers. This was Rahmoc Enterprises last race. It marked the debut of the Generation 4 car. It also marked the debut of Joe Gibbs Racing in the form of the green and black No. 18 Chevrolet, with Dale Jarrett as the driver.

The start
The initial part of the race was clean, although on lap 41 Geoff Bodine and Morgan Shepherd touched exiting Turn 4 with no further incident. Brett Bodine and Ricky Rudd fell out in the first half of the race with separate engine failures, as the Junior Johnson cars of Sterling Marlin and Bill Elliott established themselves as the cars to beat. Davey Allison's crew gambled with a two-tire change, but caught a lucky break when Geoff Bodine was penalized for speeding, and gained a drafting partner.

The Big One
Rain fell after 80 laps, and when the race restarted Ernie Irvan went for the lead on lap 92. He came up in front of Sterling Marlin, but had not cleared him, and also moved him up the track into his teammate Bill Elliott who was on the outside. The ensuing mayhem collected polesitter Sterling Marlin, Ernie Irvan, Bill Elliott, Mark Martin, Ken Schrader and Dale Earnhardt. Also, Bobby Hillin Jr., Dale Jarrett, Alan Kulwicki, Chad Little, Richard Petty, Hut Stricklin, Rusty Wallace, and Darrell Waltrip were involved.

The wreck ended the race for Jarrett, Schrader, Marlin, Hillin, and Little, with their cars being terminally damaged.

The finish
On Lap 144 Rick Wilson was planning to pit the Stavola Brothers Ford, but Kerry Teague did not realize it and ran into him. This brought out the third yellow flag in the race. On Lap 166 Ernie Irvan's crippled car spun to bring out the fourth caution flag. Leaders Allison, Shepherd, and Michael Waltrip made their final stops. Waltrip fell back after the restart with an engine that was quitting. This left the two Ford Thunderbirds of Allison and Shepherd to race for the win, finishing in this order. This win made the Allisons the second father-son duo to win the Daytona 500, joining Lee and Richard Petty. Alan Kulwicki finished a quiet fourth which kicked off an unlikely championship run.

Results

The winning car Davey Allison used was auctioned off at Barrett-Jackson car auction complete with the winning driver's trophy and driving uniform.

Additional facts
 Since this Daytona 500, the leader of lap 100 has never gone on to win the race.
 Kyle Petty, son of Richard and grandson of Lee (both former winners), posted what would be his best Daytona 500 result (6th) in 27 starts.

References

Daytona 500
Daytona 500
NASCAR races at Daytona International Speedway